Kim Sung-eun (born July 23, 1991) is a South Korean actress. She is known for her role as Park Mi-dal in 1998 TV series Soonpoong Clinic.

Filmography

Television series

Film

Awards and nominations

References

External links

Kim Sung-eun at Daum 

1991 births
Living people
People from Seongnam
South Korean television actresses
South Korean film actresses
South Korean child actresses
20th-century South Korean actresses